The current president of Loyola University Maryland is the Reverend Brian F. Linnane, S.J.  Entering the Society of Jesus in 1977, Linnane was ordained on June 14, 1986, and has degrees from Boston College, Georgetown University, the Jesuit School of Theology at Berkeley, and the Yale University Department of Religious Studies.

Linnane joined the Religious Studies Department at Holy Cross in 1994, serving as Assistant Dean at College of the Holy Cross from 2003 to 2005 and was named a Loyola College Trustee in 2000. He currently serves as a member of the Board of Trustees of the College of the Holy Cross; the Institute of Christian and Jewish Studies; the Caroline Center in Baltimore; and the Gilchrist Center for Hospice Care in Baltimore. He is a member of the NCAA Division I Committee on Athletics Certification, a member of the Greater Baltimore Committee’s President’s Advisory Council and in 2008, began a term as President of the Metro Atlantic Athletic Conference Council of Presidents.

Linnane's tenure as president has not been devoid of controversy. In Summer 2008, the Executive Committee of Loyola College in Maryland’s Board of Trustees announced that it affirmed and ratified an April 2008 preliminary decision of the full Board to change Loyola’s designation from “College” to “University." The decision was made after months of discussion and research, which revealed strong feelings on both sides of the issue.

The possibility of changing Loyola's designation emerged from the development of Loyola's new strategic plan, "Grounded in Tradition, Educating for the Future," a document designed to guide Loyola's direction and initiatives through 2013. Influenced greatly by Linnane and his vision for Loyola, the plan focuses on a central goal that asserts that Loyola will be the nation's leading Catholic, comprehensive university. As such, the plan aims to elevate all aspects of the university, from undergraduate and graduate programs and support to faculty development to community engagement to athletics.

Terrence M. Sawyer was selected on October 20, 2021 to succeed Linnane as Loyola's 25th president. He has served in the university's administration since 1998 and has been its senior vice president since 2017. The first layperson to serve as Loyola's president, he will assume the office on January 1, 2022.

List of presidents
 Rev. John Early, S.J. (1852–1858)
 Rev. William Francis Clarke, S.J. (1858–1860)
 Rev. Joseph O'Callaghan, S.J. (1860–1863)
 Rev. Anthony Ciampi, S.J. (1863–1866)
 Rev. John Early, S.J (1866–1870)
Rev. Edward Henchy, S.J. (1870–1871)
 Rev. Stephen A. Kelly, S.J. (1871–1877)
 Rev. Edwards McGurk, S.J (1877–1885)
 Rev. Francis Smith, S.J. (1885–1891)
 Rev. John Abell Morgan, S.J. (1891–1900)
 Rev. John Quirk, S.J. (1901–1907)
 Rev. W. G. Read Mullan, S.J (1907–1908)
 Rev. Francis X. Brady, S.J. (1908–1911)
 Rev. William Ennis, S.J. (1911–1918)
 Rev. Joseph McEneany, S.J. (1918–1926)
 Rev. Henri J. Wiesel, S.J. (1927–1934)
 Rev. Joseph A. Canning, S.J. (1934–1938)
 Rev. Edward B. Bunn, S.J. (1938–1947)
 Rev. Francis X. Talbot, S.J. (1947–1950)
 Rev. Thomas J. Murray, S.J. (1950–1955)
 Rev. Vincent Beatty, S.J. (1955–1964)
 Rev. Joseph A. Sellinger, S.J. (1964–1993)
 Rev. Harold Ridley, S.J. (1994–2005)
 Rev. Brian F. Linnane, S.J. (2005–2021)
 Terrence M. Sawyer (January 1, 2022– )

References

Loyola University Maryland